Francis "Frankie" Bryant (born 17 January 1982) is a former New Zealand rugby union player. He notably played for the Manawatu Turbos in the National Provincial Championship, mainly as a centre.

A strong runner, Bryant formed a great partnership with former players, Matty James and Johnny Leota.

References

Living people
New Zealand rugby union players
1982 births
Manawatu rugby union players
Rugby union centres
Rugby union players from Masterton